Nediljko Kovačević (born 16 October 1995) is a Croatian professional footballer who plays as a left back or left winger for Urania.

Club career
He has previously played for Bregenz and Vorwärts Steyr in Austria, for German sides Schwarz-Weiß Rehden and VfR Mannheim, Croatian outfits Kustošija and Pajde, Koper in Slovenia and Tatran Prešov in Slovakia.

References

External links
 

1995 births
Living people
Footballers from Split, Croatia
Association football fullbacks
Croatian footballers
SW Bregenz players
SK Vorwärts Steyr players
BSV Schwarz-Weiß Rehden players
NK Kustošija players
FC Koper players
1. FC Tatran Prešov players
PFC Slavia Sofia players
HŠK Posušje players
Austrian Regionalliga players
Regionalliga players
First Football League (Croatia) players
2. Liga (Slovakia) players
First Professional Football League (Bulgaria) players
2. Liga Interregional players
First League of the Federation of Bosnia and Herzegovina players
Croatian expatriate footballers
Expatriate footballers in the Czech Republic
Croatian expatriate sportspeople in the Czech Republic
Expatriate footballers in Austria
Croatian expatriate sportspeople in Austria
Expatriate footballers in Germany
Croatian expatriate sportspeople in Germany
Expatriate footballers in Slovenia
Croatian expatriate sportspeople in Slovenia
Expatriate footballers in Slovakia
Croatian expatriate sportspeople in Slovakia
Expatriate footballers in Bulgaria
Croatian expatriate sportspeople in Bulgaria
Expatriate footballers in Switzerland
Croatian expatriate sportspeople in Switzerland
Expatriate footballers in Bosnia and Herzegovina
Croatian expatriate sportspeople in Bosnia and Herzegovina